Bernard Szczepański (11 October 1945 – 21 September 2018) was a Polish wrestler who competed in the 1972 Summer Olympics.

References

External links
 

1945 births
2018 deaths
Olympic wrestlers of Poland
Wrestlers at the 1972 Summer Olympics
Polish male sport wrestlers
Sportspeople from Ruda Śląska